Matei Millo (November 24/25, 1814 – September 9, 1896) was a Moldavian, later Romanian stage actor and playwright.

Born in Stolniceni-Prăjescu, Iași County, his grandfather was the poet Matei Milu; his parents were Vasile Millo and Zamfira (née Prăjescu). He was first educated by private tutors at home, then at a private boarding school in Iași from 1833 to 1834, followed by Academia Mihăileană from 1835 to 1836. While living in Paris from 1840 to 1845, he studied theatre, took private lessons, followed the great actors of the day (Frédérick Lemaître, François Jules Edmond Got, Hugues Bouffé, Pierre-Alfred Ravel) and probably played minor roles with French troupes. In 1846, after returning home, he began organizing the theatre in the Danubian Principalities, first at Iași until 1852, and then at Bucharest.

From 1864 to 1866, he taught at the Bucharest Conservatory, while in 1877 he established an associated artists' troupe. Beginning in 1851, he staged numerous performances for the Romanians living under Imperial Austrian rule in Transylvania and Bukovina. He was much loved by the public for his repertoire, in which the comedies of Vasile Alecsandri featured most prominently, and for his playing style, comically realist, with touches of gravity. He wrote a number of translations, local adaptations and original plays, helping fill gaps in the scanty Romanian theatrical repertoire of the time. His published volumes include Un poet romantic (1850), Baba Hârca (1851), Masca pe obraz sau Hai să râdem (1862) and Apele de la Văcărești (1872). He died in Bucharest.

Notes

1814 births
1896 deaths
People from Iași County
Romanian male stage actors
19th-century Romanian male actors
19th-century Romanian dramatists and playwrights